Maheman (The Guest) is a Bollywood film. It was released in 1942. The film was produced by Ranjit Studios and directed by Chaturbhuj Doshi. The film starred Madhuri, Ishwarlal, Mubarak, Bhagwandas and Shamim Bano. The music was directed by Khemchand Prakash, with lyrics by D. N. Madhok.

Cast
 Madhuri
 Ishwarlal
 Shamim Bano
 Rama Shukal
 Mubarak
 Kesari
 Gharpure
 Bhagwandas
 Indira

Soundtrack
The film's music was composed by Khemchand Prakash with lyrics written by D. N. Madhok. The singers were Rajkumari, Shamim Akhtar, Kesari, Sunila Das Gupta and Bulo C. Rani.

Song List

References

External links
 

1942 films
1940s Hindi-language films
Films scored by Khemchand Prakash
Indian black-and-white films
Films directed by Chaturbhuj Doshi